Thomaz Bellucci was the title defender, but he chose not to compete this year.
Paolo Lorenzi became the new champion, after he defeated against Federico del Bonis in the final 6–2, 6–0.

Seeds

Draw

Finals

Top half

Bottom half

References
Main Draw
Qualifying Singles

Riviera di Rimini Challenger - Singles
Riviera di Rimini Challenger